The 1996 Coppa Italia Final was the final of the 1995–96 Coppa Italia, the 49th season of the top cup competition in Italian football. The match was played over two legs on 2 and 18 May 1996 between Fiorentina and Atalanta. The final was won by Fiorentina, who claimed their fifth Coppa Italia title with a 3–0 aggregate victory.

First leg

Second leg

References
rsssf.com

1995–96 in Italian football cups
Coppa Italia Finals
Coppa Italia Final 1996
Coppa Italia Final 1996
May 1996 sports events in Europe